The Oskarshamn Maritime Museum is located in Oskarshamn, Sweden. The Museum exhibits items related to the merchandise shipping and shipbuilding activity in the Oskarshamn area.

History 
The Oskarshamn Maritime Museum was founded in 1954. The main part of the exhibition is located to Kulturhuset at Hantverksgatan 18 in the central parts of Oskarshamn. The Museum was completely remodeled in 2012. 

In 2009 a new branch of the museum was opened in a building at the harbour-area, exhibiting the marine steam engine from 1912 that once powered the SS Gustafsberg VII, as well as a number of smaller wooden boats. The tugboat S/S Nalle moored nearby, is also a part of the museum. The S/S Nalle was built and launched at the Oskarshamn Shipyard in 1923.

Collection 

The main museum at Kulturhuset exhibits a large collection of ship models and ship portraits, as well as navigational equipment,  photographs, nautical charts, films, books and ship construction  drawings. There are also items related to the ferry traffic between Oskarshamn and Visby, which has been going on since more than a century.

See also 
 Oskarshamn Shipyard
 Port of Oskarshamn

References 
 Maritime Atlas.eu about the Oskarshamn Maritime Museum.
 Oskarshamn Maritime Museum at the Oskarshamn Municipality homepage (in Swedish)
 Småland-Öland.se - Information on Oskarshamn Maritime Museum
 Association of the Oskarshamn Maritime Museum (in Swedish)

Notes

Oskarshamn
Maritime museums in Sweden
Museums in Kalmar County
Tourist attractions in Kalmar County